Shevchenkivskyi District is an urban district of the city of Kharkiv, Ukraine, named after the Ukrainian poet Taras Shevchenko.

The district was created in 1932 out of parts of Ivano-Lysohirskyi and Petynsko-Zhuravlivskyi districts. It was named as Dzerzhynskyi after the communist mass murderer Felix Dzerzhinsky, head of Cheka (All-Russian Extraordinary Commission). It was renamed to its current name in February 2016 to comply with decommunization laws.

Places
 Universytetska hirka
 Derzhprom (Gosprom)
 Pavlivka
 Shatylivka
 Sokolnyky
 Pavlove Pole
 Oleksiivka
 Tykhi vulytsi

References

External links
 Dzerzhynsky Raion website
 Volkov, E. Dzerzhynskiy Raion: From its origins to the contemporary times (ДЗЕРЖИНСКИЙ РАЙОН: ОТ ИСТОКОВ ДО СОВРЕМЕННОСТИ). Eduard Volkov website. 20 May 2010.

Urban districts of Kharkiv